The lovegrass noctuid moth (Hypena plagiota) was a moth in the family Erebidae. The species was first described by Edward Meyrick in 1899. It was endemic to Kauaʻi, Oʻahu, and Maui but is now considered extinct.

Larvae have been recorded feeding on Eragrostis species.

References

Endemic moths of Hawaii
Extinct Hawaiian animals
Extinct moths
Extinct insects since 1500
Taxonomy articles created by Polbot